Due mafiosi contro Al Capone (literally "Two Mafiamen against Al Capone") is a 1966 Italian-Spanish gangster-comedy film directed by Giorgio Simonelli starring the comic duo Franco and Ciccio.

Cast 

 Franco Franchi as Franco
 Ciccio Ingrassia as Ciccio
 José Calvo as Al Capone
 Moira Orfei as  Rosalia
Marc Lawrence  as  Joe Minasi
 Luigi Pavese as Police Inspector
 Frank Braña as Bud Messina 
 Angela Luce as Santuzza
 Gino Buzzanca as  Calogero
 Jesús Puente as  Tony 
Ignazio Leone  as  Bookmaker 
 Solvi Stubing as  Night Club Girl  
Tano Cimarosa  as  Gangster 
Enzo Andronico  as Lawyer
Michele Malaspina as  Senator
Franco Diogene  as  Night Club Announcer

References

External links

1960s buddy comedy films
1960s crime comedy films
Italian crime comedy films
Spanish crime comedy films
Films about Al Capone
Films directed by Giorgio Simonelli
Films scored by Piero Umiliani
Italian buddy comedy films
Cultural depictions of Al Capone
1966 comedy films
1966 films
Cultural depictions of Rudolph Valentino
1960s Italian films
1960s Italian-language films